Frank J. Smith (born September 27, 1942) is an American politician, previously serving as a member of the Montana Senate, representing District 16. He served in the Montana Senate from 2004 until 2008 when he was succeeded by Jonathan Windy Boy. He was re-elected to the Montana Senate in 2016, and served from 2017–2020. In 2020, he was elected to the Montana House of Representatives, representing District 31.

He was previously a member of the Montana House of Representatives. He served from 1998 through 2004 and then again from 2011 to 2013.

References

External links
 Project Vote Smart - Senator Frank J. Smith (MT) profile

1942 births
Living people
Democratic Party members of the Montana House of Representatives
Democratic Party Montana state senators
Native American state legislators in Montana
People from Poplar, Montana
21st-century American politicians